Florence Louisa Barclay  (2 December 1862 – 10 March 1921) was an English romance novelist and short story writer.

Biography
She was born Florence Louisa Charlesworth in Limpsfield, Surrey, England, the daughter of the local Anglican rector. One of three girls, she was a sister to Maud Ballington Booth, the Salvation Army leader and co-founder of the Volunteers of America. When Florence was seven years old, the family moved to Limehouse in the London Borough of Tower Hamlets.

In 1881, Florence Charlesworth married the Rev. Charles W. Barclay and honeymooned in the Holy Land, where, in Shechem, they reportedly discovered Jacob's Well, the place where, according to the Gospel of St John, Jesus met the woman of Samaria. Florence Barclay and her husband settled in Hertford Heath, in Hertfordshire, where she fulfilled the duties of a rector's wife. She became the mother of eight children. In her early forties health problems left her bedridden for a time and she passed the hours by writing what became her first romance novel titled The Wheels of Time. Her next novel, The Rosary, a story of undying love, was published in 1909 and its success eventually resulted in its being translated into eight languages and made into five motion pictures, also in several languages. According to the New York Times, the novel was the No.1 bestselling novel of 1910 in the United States. The enduring popularity of the book was such that more than twenty-five years later, Sunday Circle magazine serialized the story and in 1926 the prominent French playwright Alexandre Bisson adapted the book as a three-act play for the Parisian stage.

Florence Barclay wrote eleven books in all, including a work of non-fiction. Her novel The Mistress of Shenstone (1910) was made into a silent film of the same title in 1921. Her short story Under the Mulberry Tree appeared in the special issue called "The Spring Romance Number" of the Ladies Home Journal of 11 May 1911.

Florence Barclay died in 1921 at the age of fifty-eight. The Life of Florence Barclay: a study in personality was published anonymously that year by G. P. Putnam's Sons "by one of Her Daughters."

Bibliography
Guy Mervyn  (1891) under the pen-name of Brandon Roy (revised by one of her daughters in 1932)
The Wheels of Time  (1908)
The Rosary  (1909)
The Mistress of Shenstone  (1910)
The Following of the Star  (1911)
Through the Postern Gate  (1911)
The Upas Tree  (1912) 
The Broken Halo  (1913)
The Wall of Partition  (1914)
The Golden Censer  (1914)
 My Heart's Right There  (1914)
In Hoc Vince: The Story of the Red Cross Flag  (1915) (non-fiction)
The White Ladies of Worcester  (1917) 
Returned Empty  (1920)
Shorter Works  (1923) collection of short stories and articles published posthumously

Film adaptations
The Mistress of Shenstone, directed by Henry King (1921, based on the novel The Mistress of Shenstone)
, directed by Tony Lekain (France, 1934, based on the novel The Rosary)
El rosario, directed by Juan José Ortega (Mexico, 1944, based on the novel The Rosary)

External links
 
 
 

1862 births
1921 deaths
English short story writers
English women novelists
English non-fiction writers
British women short story writers
English women non-fiction writers
People from Surrey (before 1889)